Laval Le Mistral (1998–2001) was a women's ice hockey team in the National Women's Hockey League (NWHL). The team played its home games in Colisée de Laval in Laval, Quebec, Canada.

History

Season-by-season

Note: GP = Games played, W = Wins, L = Losses, T = Ties, GF = Goals for, GA = Goals against, Pts = Points.

1998–99 NWHL Season and playoffs
Le Mistral started at the end of the 1997–98 college and university year with a group of players limited experience at the elite Senior AAA level. Le Mistral enter to the NWHL but the team has a difficult first season: In 34 games 9 wins and 21 defeats. For the playoffs, Laval Le mistral was elimined in Eastern first round: April 10, 1999– Bonaventure Wingstar 4 at Laval Le Mistral 2 and
April 11, 1999– Laval Le Mistral 3 at Bonaventure Wingstar 8. The Bonaventure Wingstar wins 2 games and pass to Eastern Division Finals

1999–2000 NWHL season
Laval Le Mistral's Annie Desrosiers was second leader in the league in goals with 29. Her 45 points ranked eleventh in the league. She was an assistant captain despite being a 20-year-old. For the 2000–01 season, the team captain was 21-year-old Anik Bouchard. Two members of the Japanese National Team competed for Le Mistral: Masako Sato was second leader in Laval Le Mistral for scoring and her sister the defender Rie Sato . During the season, Le Mistral allowed an average of five goals per game, second last in the NWHL. Goaltender Marieve Dyotte was 5–10–1 with a 6.44 goals against average, while Vania Goeury was 2–14–3 with 4.08 GAA. During the season, Laval received 605 penalty minutes. The result was allowing 44 goals in 35 games. Anik Bouchard had 91 minutes, Isabelle Chartrand (88 minutes) and Valerie Levesque had 60 minutes.

2000–2001 NWHL Eastern Division Playoffs
Round 1: Laval Le Mistral vs Sainte-Julie Pantheres
Saturday February 26 and Sunday February 27, the Sainte-Julie Pantheres eliminated the Laval Le Mistral, winning their two-game series 2–0.

Season standing

Last roster 2000–01

Notable former players
 Masako Sato, forward (Japan)
 Rie Sato, defender (Japan)
 Maren Valenti (Germany)
 Isabelle Chartrand, defender, a member of Canada's 1999 National Women's Team.
 Charline Labonte, Goaltender, a member of Canada National Team.

Award and honour
1998/99 Eastern Division 1st All Star Team: Annie Desrosiers (forward) and Isabelle Chartrand(defender)
1998/99 Eastern Division 2sd All Star Team: Vania Goeury (goalie), Anik Bouchard (defender) and Julie Pelletier (forward)
1999/2000 Eastern Division 1st All Star Team: Annie Desrosiers (forward) and Isabelle Chartrand(defender)

Former Staff
    General Manager: Michel Dyotte
    Head Coach:  Marcel Dube
    Assistant Coach:  Benoit Constantineau
    Assistant Coach:  Christian Dugel

See also
 National Women's Hockey League (1999–2007) (NWHL)

References

External links
 Laval Le Mistral 2000 Preview
 NWHL website
 NWHL Season 1998–99
 NWHL Season 2000–01

National Women's Hockey League (1999–2007) teams
Women's ice hockey teams in Canada
Ice hockey teams in Quebec
Sport in Laval, Quebec
1998 establishments in Quebec
Ice hockey clubs established in 1998
2001 disestablishments in Quebec
Sports clubs disestablished in 2001
Women in Quebec